"But Can She Type?" is the second segment of the thirteenth episode from the first season (1985–86) of the television series The Twilight Zone. In this segment, a secretary travels to an alternate dimension where secretaries are revered in a manner similar to A-list movie stars and fashion models in the real world.

Plot
Karen Billings is an overworked, underappreciated secretary. Her colleague Marcy is studying to be a lawyer and encourages Karen to change career paths as well, but while Karen loathes her current boss, she loves being a secretary. While making copies on the office Xerox machine, it malfunctions and Karen is transported to another reality. Unaware that she is no longer in her own universe, Karen attends a party where she is supposed to meet her boyfriend. She discovers to her surprise that secretaries are a cherished commodity in this dimension. Men become nervous in her presence and women talk of how jealous they are of her position. Even the hostess feels her party is now a real event upon finding out a secretary has deemed her party worthy enough to attend. A man named Rehnquist offers her a job at his company. She stays at the party until midnight, regaling the guests with stories of her adventures as a secretary. She returns to the copy room to retrieve her dropped keys, accidentally runs the Xerox machine again, and is returned to her reality.

Still unaware of the change, Karen returns home to find a message from her boyfriend about missing her at the party. She remembers the card given to her by Rehnquist and calls, but the number is not in service. Karen returns to work. Irate over her work being one copy short (due to that copy having been produced while in the alternate dimension), her boss makes derogatory remarks about her and secretaries in general. While talking with Marcy, Karen realizes what has happened. She runs down to the copy room and finds workmen about to remove the defective machine. She fights them off and operates the copier. A flash of light erupts and Karen disappears. Now in the alternate dimension, Karen calls the number on the card, which now works. Rehnquist ushers her to a waiting limousine, which takes her to the company's Paris office.

External links
 

1985 American television episodes
The Twilight Zone (1985 TV series season 1) episodes
Television episodes about parallel universes

fr:Copie non conforme